The Pittsburgh Penguins (colloquially known as the Pens) are a professional ice hockey team based in Pittsburgh. They compete in the National Hockey League (NHL) as a member of the Metropolitan Division of the Eastern Conference, and have played their home games at PPG Paints Arena, originally known as Consol Energy Center, since 2010. The team previously played at the Civic Arena, also known as "the Igloo". The Penguins are currently affiliated with two minor league teams – the Wilkes-Barre/Scranton Penguins of the American Hockey League (AHL) and the Wheeling Nailers of the ECHL.

Founded during the 1967 expansion, the Penguins have qualified for six Stanley Cup Finals, winning the Stanley Cup five times—in 1991, 1992, 2009, 2016, and 2017. Along with the Edmonton Oilers, the Penguins are tied for the most Stanley Cup championships among the non-Original Six teams and sixth overall. With their Stanley Cup wins in 2016 and 2017, the Penguins became the first back-to-back champions in the salary cap era. Several of the team's former members have been inducted into the Hockey Hall of Fame, including co-owner Mario Lemieux, who purchased the Penguins in 1999 and brought the club out of bankruptcy. Lemieux, Jaromir Jagr, Sidney Crosby, and Evgeni Malkin have won the Hart Memorial Trophy while playing for the franchise.

Team history

Early years (1967–1984)
Prior to the arrival of the Penguins, Pittsburgh had been the home of the NHL's Pittsburgh Pirates from 1925 to 1930 and of the American Hockey League's Pittsburgh Hornets franchise from 1936 to 1967 (with a short break from 1956 to 1961). In the spring of 1965, Jack McGregor, a state senator from Kittanning, Pennsylvania, began lobbying campaign contributors and community leaders to bring an NHL franchise back to Pittsburgh. The group focused on leveraging the NHL as an urban renewal tool for Pittsburgh. The senator formed a group of local investors that included H. J. Heinz Company heir H. J. Heinz III, Pittsburgh Steelers' owner Art Rooney and the Mellon family's Richard Mellon Scaife. The projected league expansion depended on securing votes from the then-current NHL owners; to ensure Pittsburgh would be selected as one of the expansion cities, McGregor enlisted Rooney to petition votes from James D. Norris, owner of the Chicago Black Hawks and his brother Bruce Norris, owner of the Detroit Red Wings. The effort was successful, and on February 8, 1966, the National Hockey League awarded an expansion team to Pittsburgh for the 1967–68 season. The Penguins paid $2.5 million ($ million today) for their entry and $750,000 ($ million today) more for start-up costs. The Civic Arena's capacity was boosted from 10,732 to 12,500 to meet the NHL requirements for expansion. The Pens also paid an indemnification bill to settle with the Detroit Red Wings, which owned the Pittsburgh Hornets franchise. The investor group named McGregor president and chief executive officer, and he represented Pittsburgh on the NHL's Board of Governors.

A contest was held where 700 of 26,000 entries picked "Penguins" as the team's nickname, sharing its nickname with the athletic department of the newly named Youngstown State University in nearby Youngstown, Ohio. (Youngstown is part of the Penguins' territorial rights to this day, though they did briefly share them with the Cleveland Barons in the mid-1970s.) Mark Peters had the winning entry (which was inspired because the team was to play in the "Igloo", the nickname of the Pittsburgh Civic Arena), a logo was chosen that had a penguin in front of a triangle, which symbolized the "Golden Triangle" of downtown Pittsburgh. The Penguins' first general manager, Jack Riley, opened the first pre-season camp for the franchise in Brantford, Ontario, on September 13, 1967, playing the franchise's first exhibition match in Brantford against the Philadelphia Flyers on September 23, 1967. Restrictive rules which kept most major talent with the existing "Original Six" teams hampered the Pens, along with the rest of the expansion teams. Beyond aging sniper Andy Bathgate, all-star defenseman Leo Boivin (who had begun his professional career with the Hornets) and New York Rangers' veteran Earl Ingarfield, a cast of former minor leaguers largely manned the first Penguins' team. Several players played for the Hornets the previous season: Bathgate, wingers Val Fonteyne and Ab McDonald, and goaltenders Hank Bassen and Joe Daley. George Sullivan was named the head coach for the club's first two seasons, and McDonald was named the team's first captain.

On October 11, 1967, league president Clarence Campbell and McGregor jointly dropped the ceremonial first puck of the Penguins' opening home game against the Montreal Canadiens. On October 21, 1967, they became the first team from the expansion class to defeat an Original Six team, as they defeated the Chicago Black Hawks 4–2. However, the Penguins went 27–34–13 and finished in fifth place in the West Division, missing the playoffs and ending with the third-worst record in the league. The team's best player proved to be longtime Cleveland Barons AHL goaltender Les Binkley, who recorded a 2.88 goals-against average and was second in the league with six shutouts. Defensive winger Ken Schinkel won the team's sole league honor, being named to represent the Penguins in the NHL All-Star Game. Bathgate led the team in scoring with 59 points but retired at season's end. McDonald, who led the team in goals and was second in team scoring, was also gone at season's end, traded to the St. Louis Blues in exchange for center Lou Angotti.

The next season, 1968–69 saw the team slip in the standings amid a sharp drop in form by Binkley, into sixth place and with the league's worst record. Several changes were made to improve the team, resulting in Boivin and several others being traded, and new players—including longtime future Pens star Jean Pronovost—making their debuts. No captain was named to replace McDonald; the team went with four alternate captains.

Triumph of playoff berths and tragedy of Briere (1969–1974)

In the 1969 draft the Penguins selected Michel Briere who, although being chosen 26th, was soon drawing comparisons to Phil Esposito and Bobby Clarke. Joining the team in November, he finished as the second-place rookie scorer in the NHL (behind Bobby Clarke) with 44 points (57th overall), and third on the Penguins. Briere placed second in Calder Memorial Trophy voting for Rookie of the Year honors behind Chicago goaltender Tony Esposito. Briere led Pittsburgh to its first NHL playoff berth since the 1928 Pirates. The Penguins defeated the Oakland Seals in a four-game sweep in the quarterfinals, with Briere scoring the series-clinching goal in overtime. In the semi-final round, defending conference champions St. Louis Blues got the best of the Penguins during six games. Briere led the team in playoff scoring, recording five goals (including three game-winners) and eight points. Tragedy struck the Penguins just days after their playoff heroics. On May 15, 1970, Briere was in a car crash in his native Quebec, suffering brain trauma and slipping into a coma from which he would never recover; he died a year later. His number 21 jersey was never reissued, remaining out of circulation until it was formally retired in 2001.

In the 1970–71 season, the Penguins finished five games out of the playoffs with a 21–37–20 record, the fourth-worst record in the league. Pittsburgh achieved a playoff berth in 1972, only to be swept by the Chicago Black Hawks in the first round. Except for a handful of players like Ken Schinkel, Pronovost, Syl Apps Jr., Keith McCreary, agitator Bryan Watson and goaltender Les Binkley, talent was thin, but enough for the Penguins to reach the playoffs in both 1970 and 1972.
The Penguins battled the California Golden Seals for the division cellar in 1974, when Riley was fired as general manager and replaced by Jack Button. Button obtained Steve Durbano, Ab DeMarco, Bob "Battleship" Kelly and Bob Paradise through trades. The personnel moves proved successful, and the team improved to a 28–41–9 record, although they remained nine points away from a playoff berth.

However, in early 1975, the Penguins' creditors demanded payment of back debts, forcing the team into bankruptcy. The doors to the team's offices were padlocked, and it looked like the Penguins would fold or relocate. Around the same time, rumors began circulating that the Penguins and the California Golden Seals were to be relocated to Seattle and Denver respectively, the two cities that were to have been the sites of an expansion for the 1976–77 season. Through the intervention of a group that included former Minnesota North Stars head coach Wren Blair, the team was prevented from folding and remained in Pittsburgh, eventually being bought by shopping mall magnate Edward J. DeBartolo, Sr.

Playoff runs and a uniform change (1974–1982)

Beginning in the mid-1970s, Pittsburgh iced some powerful offensive clubs, led by the likes of the "Century Line" of Syl Apps, Lowell MacDonald and Jean Pronovost. They nearly reached the Stanley Cup semi-finals in 1975, but were ousted from the playoffs by the New York Islanders in one of the only four best-of-seven-game series in NHL history where a team came back from being down three games to none. As the 1970s wore on, a mediocre team defense neutralized the Penguins' success beyond the regular season. Baz Bastien, a former coach and general manager of the AHL's Hornets, later became general manager. The Penguins missed the playoffs in 1977–78. Bastien traded prime draft picks for several players whose best years were already behind them, and the team would suffer in the early 1980s as a result. The decade closed with a playoff appearance in 1979 and a rousing opening series win over the Buffalo Sabres before a second-round sweep at the hands of the Boston Bruins.

The Penguins began the 1980s by changing their team colors; in January 1980, the team switched from wearing blue and white to their present-day scheme of black and gold to honor Pittsburgh's other sports teams, the Pittsburgh Pirates and the Pittsburgh Steelers, as well as the Flag of Pittsburgh. Both the Pirates and Steelers had worn black and gold for decades, and both had enjoyed world championship seasons. The Bruins protested this color change, claiming a monopoly on black and gold, but the Penguins defended their choice stating that the NHL Pirates also used black and gold as their team colors and that black and gold were Pittsburgh's traditional sporting colors. The NHL agreed, and Pittsburgh could use black and gold. The Penguins officially debuted the black and gold uniform in a game against the St. Louis Blues at the Civic Arena on January 30, 1980. On the ice, the Penguins began the 1980s with defenseman Randy Carlyle, and prolific scorers Paul Gardner and Mike Bullard but little else.

During the early part of the decade, the Penguins made a habit of being a tough draw for higher-seeded opponents in the playoffs. In 1980, the 13th-seeded Penguins took the Bruins to the limit in their first-round playoff series. The following season, as the 15th seed, they lost the decisive game of their first-round series in overtime to the heavily favored St. Louis Blues. Then, in the 1982 playoffs, the Penguins held a 3–1 lead late in the fifth and final game of their playoff series against the reigning champions, the New York Islanders. However, the Islanders rallied to force overtime and won the series on a goal by John Tonelli, who had tied the game before. It would be the Pens' final playoff appearance until 1989.

Lemieux–Jagr era (1984–2005)

The team had the league's worst record in both the 1983 and 1984 seasons. With the team suffering financial problems, it seemed the Penguins would either fold or relocate. Mario Lemieux, one of the most highly touted NHL draft picks in history, was due to be drafted in the 1984 NHL Entry Draft. Heading towards the end of the season ahead of the New Jersey Devils, who were placed last, the Penguins made several questionable moves that appeared to weaken the team in the short term. They posted three six-game winless streaks in the last 21 games of the season and earned the right to draft Lemieux amidst protests from Devils' management. Pittsburgh head coach Lou Angotti later admitted that a conscious decision was made to finish the season as the team with the worst record, saying in an interview with the Pittsburgh Post-Gazette that a mid-season lunch prompted the plan, because there was a high chance of the franchise folding if Lemieux was not drafted. Other teams offered substantial trade packages for the draft choice, but the Penguins kept the pick and drafted Lemieux first overall. Lemieux paid dividends right away, scoring on his first-ever shot of his first-ever NHL shift in his first NHL game. However, the team spent four more years out of the playoffs after his arrival. In the late 1980s, the Penguins finally gave Lemieux a strong supporting cast, trading for superstar defenseman Paul Coffey from the Edmonton Oilers (after the Oilers' 1987 Stanley Cup win) and bringing in young talent like scorers Kevin Stevens, Rob Brown and John Cullen from the minors. The team finally acquired a top-flight goaltender with the acquisition of Tom Barrasso from Buffalo. All this talent had an immediate impact in helping Lemieux lead the Pens; but the team struggled to make the playoffs. The 1985–86 Pens missed the playoffs on the final day of the season by one game. In 1986–87, they missed the playoffs by just two games and saw four teams with equal or worse records qualify. In 1987–88, for the second time in a row, the Penguins missed the playoffs by one game.

In 1989, Pittsburgh finally broke through the barrier and made the playoffs on the back of Lemieux leading the league in goals, assists and points. On December 31, 1988, Lemieux became the only player in history to score a goal in all five possible game situations in the same game (even strength, shorthanded, penalty shot, power play, and empty net). The Pens shocked the New York Rangers in a four-game sweep in the first round; however, the Philadelphia Flyers halted their in the second round. The seven-game defeat featured Lemieux scoring five goals in the fifth game.

Back-to-back Stanley Cup titles (1989–1997)

A herniated disc in Lemieux's back cut short his 1989–90 season, although he still amassed 123 points. However, the Penguins fell out of the playoff picture. They opted to strengthen their roster and support Lemieux in the 1990 off-season. Free-agent signings (Bryan Trottier) and trades (Joe Mullen, Larry Murphy, Ron Francis and Ulf Samuelsson) played a major part in this. Arguably no move was bigger during this time than when the Penguins drafted Jaromir Jagr with the fifth overall pick in the 1990 NHL Entry Draft. The first Czechoslovak player to be drafted into the NHL without first needing to defect to the West, Jagr became the Penguins' second franchise player, and quickly developed into a superstar offensive talent.
The roster overhaul culminated in the Penguins winning their first Stanley Cup title by defeating the Minnesota North Stars in the Stanley Cup Finals in six games, punctuated by an 8–0 victory in the deciding game, the largest margin of victory in a final Stanley Cup game in over 80 years. After the 1991 Stanley Cup Finals, the Penguins met with President George H. W. Bush, the first NHL team ever to visit the White House. The following season, the team lost coach Bob Johnson to cancer, and Scotty Bowman took over as coach. Under Bowman, they swept the Chicago Blackhawks to repeat as Stanley Cup champions in 1991–92.

Cancer revisited the Penguins in 1993 when Lemieux was tragically diagnosed with Hodgkin lymphoma. Only two months after the diagnosis, missing 24 out of 84 games, he came back to win his fourth Art Ross Trophy as scoring champion with 160 points, edging out Pat LaFontaine and Adam Oates. Despite the off-ice difficulties, Pittsburgh finished with a 56–21–7 record, the franchise's best regular-season ever, winning the Presidents' Trophy. After Lemieux's return, the team played better than it ever had before, winning an NHL-record 17 consecutive games. Despite all of this success, the New York Islanders eliminated them in the second round of Game 7 in overtime.

The Penguins continued to be a formidable team throughout the 1990s. The stars of the Stanley Cup years were followed by the likes of forwards: Alexei Kovalev, Martin Straka, Aleksey Morozov, Robert Lang and Petr Nedved, and defensemen Sergei Zubov, Darius Kasparaitis and Kevin Hatcher. Despite the departure of many of the franchise's Stanley Cup-winning roster, the Penguins fielded enough talent to reach the first round of the playoffs in 1994 (where they lost to the Washington Capitals in six games), the second round in 1995 (where they lost to the New Jersey Devils in five games) and the conference finals in 1996 (where they lost to the Florida Panthers in seven games). The 1997 playoffs marked a turning point, as the Penguins suffered a first-round elimination at the hands of the rival Philadelphia Flyers in five games.

Lemieux's retirement and return (1997–2001)

On April 6, 1997, the franchise was rocked when Mario Lemieux, citing ongoing health concerns and his disapproval with the way NHL hockey was being officiated, announced he would retire at the conclusion of the 1997 playoffs. Lemieux was so respected in the NHL, and his achievements over the course of his career were so great, that he was inducted into the Hockey Hall of Fame in the year he retired, the three-year waiting period being waived. His departure was the first in a series of events that would once again lead the Penguins into regular season stagnation, and to the brink of financial ruin.

The Montreal Canadiens eliminated the team in the first round of the playoffs in 1998, despite being the second-seeded team in the East. The following year, their playoff run ended in the second round when they lost to the Toronto Maple Leafs in six games. In 2000, the Penguins stunned the highly touted Washington Capitals 4–1 in the first round, only to fall to the Philadelphia Flyers 4–2 in the second round. 

By this time, the lofty contracts handed out during the early 1990s were catching up with the Penguins. At one point, the team owed over $90 million to numerous creditors, leading then-owners Howard Baldwin and Morris Belzberg (who bought the Penguins after their first Stanley Cup win) to ask the players to defer their salaries to help pay the bills. When the deferred salaries finally came due, combined with other financial pressures, the Penguins were forced to file for Chapter 11 bankruptcy in November 1998. 

Lemieux then stepped in with an unusual proposal to buy the team out of bankruptcy. The Penguins owed Lemieux $32.5 million in deferred salary, making him the team's largest individual creditor. He proposed recovering this money by converting it into equity—enough to give him controlling interest. He also vowed to keep the team in Pittsburgh. The NHL and the courts agreed, and Lemieux (with help from supermarket tycoon Ronald Burkle) assumed control on September 3, 1999, saving the franchise for the second time.

Lemieux again shocked the hockey world by announcing at a press conference on December 8, 2000, his intentions to return to the Penguins as an active player. On December 27, 2000, Lemieux stepped onto NHL ice for the first time in 44 months, officially becoming the first player–owner in NHL history. Lemieux helped lead the Penguins deep into the 2001 playoffs, highlighted by an overtime victory against the Buffalo Sabres in Game 7 of the second round. Darius Kasparaitis scored the series-clinching goal to advance the Penguins to the Eastern Conference Finals, where they lost in five games to the New Jersey Devils.

Rebuilding (2001–2005)

The Penguins' attendance had dwindled in the late 1990s. In 1998–99, the club had an average attendance of 14,825 at home games, the lowest it had been since Lemieux's rookie year. Reducing revenue on top of the previous bankruptcy necessitated salary shedding. The biggest salary move was the trading of superstar Jaromir Jagr to the Washington Capitals in the summer of 2001. The Penguins missed the playoffs for the first time in 12 years in 2002, finishing in a tie for third-to-last in their conference. The following season they finished second-last. In the 2003 NHL Entry Draft, the Penguins selected goaltender Marc-Andre Fleury with the first overall pick.

The 2003–04 season was an ordeal with Lemieux missing all but 24 regular-season games with a hip injury, and attendance dipping to an average of 11,877 (the lowest average of any NHL team), with just one sellout. As the season progressed, the Penguins signed new head coach (and former Penguins' player and commentator) Eddie Olczyk and opted not to include Fleury in the lineup for the bulk of the season. This culminated in the worst record in the NHL, with the team winning just 23 games. As in the 1980s, the Penguins' struggles were fortuitously concurrent with a string of NHL Entry Draft classes that would yield multiple world-class talents. The Penguins lost out on the first overall pick for the 2004 NHL Entry Draft (Alexander Ovechkin), which went to the Washington Capitals. However, Ovechkin's countryman, center Evgeni Malkin, was similarly highly regarded, and Pittsburgh took him with the second overall pick. However, a transfer dispute between the NHL and the International Ice Hockey Federation (IIHF) delayed his Pittsburgh debut.

By this point, the Penguins had collapsed financially since the Stanley Cup-winning years of the early 1990s. Their home venue, the Civic Arena, had become the oldest arena in the NHL, and Lemieux had tried unsuccessfully to cut a deal with the city for a new facility. With Pittsburgh uninterested in building a new hockey arena for the struggling Penguins, Lemieux began looking into the possibilities of selling and/or relocating the team to Kansas City, Missouri. A lockout prompted the cancellation of the 2004–05 NHL season. One of the many reasons for the lockout included disagreements on resolving the financial struggles of teams like the Penguins and the Ottawa Senators, which had filed for bankruptcy protection. During the lockout, the Penguins' players dispersed between the club's American Hockey League (AHL) affiliate, the Wilkes-Barre/Scranton Penguins, and to European leagues.

Crosby–Malkin era (2005–present)

With the lockout resolved in 2005, the NHL organized an unprecedented draft lottery to set the 2005 NHL Entry Draft selection order. The draft lottery, which was held behind closed doors in a "secure location", resulted in the Penguins being awarded the first overall pick. Quebec Major Junior Hockey League (QMJHL) superstar Sidney Crosby (who had been training with Lemieux over the summer) was the consensus first overall pick, with many referring to the draft lottery process as "The Sidney Crosby Sweepstakes". The Penguins selected Crosby on July 30, 2005, with the top pick, instantly rekindling interest in hockey in Pittsburgh.

The Penguins began rebuilding the team under the salary cap. However, Evgeni Malkin, the Penguins' 2004 draft pick, could not report to Pittsburgh immediately because of a playing rights dispute with the Russian Superleague. The addition of Crosby paid instant dividends, with attendance rising by approximately 4,000 per game on average in the 2005–06 season. However, Crosby's presence did not immediately translate into wins, as the team began the season with a long winless skid that resulted in a head coaching change from Olczyk to Michel Therrien. Then, on January 24, 2006, Lemieux announced his second retirement,  after developing an irregular heartbeat, this time permanently. He finished as the NHL's seventh all-time scorer (1,723), eighth in goals (690) and tenth in assists (1,033), and with the second-highest career points per game average (1.88), which is second to Wayne Gretzky's 1.92.

Despite the team's struggles, Crosby established himself as a star in the league, amassing 102 points in his debut season and finishing second to Alexander Ovechkin for the Calder Memorial Trophy awarded each year to the league's top rookie. In the Penguins' final game of the season, Crosby tallied a goal and an assist to become the top-scoring rookie in Penguin history (eclipsing Lemieux). The Penguins again posted the worst record in the Eastern Conference and the highest goals-against total in the League. They received the second overall draft pick, their fourth top-two pick in four years, in the 2006 NHL Entry Draft, and selected touted two-way forward Jordan Staal. The team announced on April 20 they would not renew the contract for general manager Craig Patrick, who had been the general manager since December 1989. On May 25, Ray Shero signed a five-year contract as general manager.

Runner–up and third Stanley Cup title (2006–2009)

Change came for the Penguins on October 18, 2006, when Evgeni Malkin made his NHL debut. He set the modern NHL record with a goal in each of his first six games. Malkin would record points in 16 consecutive games. The Penguins finished the 2006–07 season in fifth place in the Eastern Conference with a record of 47–24–11, totaling 105 points, only two points behind the Atlantic Division winners, the New Jersey Devils. It was the franchise's first 100-point season in 11 years and represented an enormous 47-point leap from the previous season. In the first round of the 2007 playoffs the eventual Stanley Cup runners-up, the Ottawa Senators, defeated the Penguins 4–1. At the season's end, rookies Malkin and Jordan Staal were finalists for the Calder Memorial Trophy, awarded to the Rookie of the Year, which Malkin won.

On March 13, 2007, Pennsylvania's Governor Ed Rendell, Allegheny County Chief Executive Dan Onorato, Pittsburgh Mayor Luke Ravenstahl and Mario Lemieux of the Penguins ownership group announced an agreement had been reached among the parties to build the long-sought arena. The state-of-the-art, multi-purpose facility, the Consol Energy Center, guaranteed that the Penguins would remain in the city of Pittsburgh. Following the announcement of the plan, the Lemieux ownership group announced they no longer had plans to sell the team. On June 8, 2007, a $325 million bond was issued, and the Penguins signed a 30-year lease on September 19, binding them to the city of Pittsburgh through 2040.

After a mediocre start to the 2007–08 season, Crosby and starting goaltender Marc-Andre Fleury were both injured long-term due to high right ankle sprains. In their absence, the team flourished because of the play and leadership of Malkin. On April 2, 2008, the Penguins clinched the Atlantic Division title—their first division title in 10 years—with a 4–2 win against rivals the Philadelphia Flyers. Malkin finished the season with 106 points for second place in the league and finished as a finalist for the Hart Memorial Trophy. The team launched into their first extended playoff run in many years, beating Ottawa 4–0, defeating the New York Rangers 4–1 and then defeating the Philadelphia Flyers 4–1 to clinch the Prince of Wales Trophy. Pittsburgh lost the 2008 Stanley Cup Finals to the Detroit Red Wings in six games, finishing the playoffs with a 14–6 record. Crosby finished the playoffs with 27 points (6 goals and 21 assists in 20 games), tying Conn Smythe Trophy-winner Henrik Zetterberg (13 goals and 14 assists in 22 games) for the playoff scoring lead.

In the 2008–09 season, Malkin won the Art Ross and was again a candidate for the Hart Memorial Trophy. Crosby finished third in League scoring with 33 goals and 70 assists for 103 points, despite missing five games. The Penguins' record dipped mid-season but lifted after Dan Bylsma replaced head coach Therrien. The effect was almost instantaneous, and the Penguins recovered enough to secure home-ice advantage in their first-round match up against the Philadelphia Flyers, whom the Penguins defeated in six games. It took seven games for the Penguins to win the next series against Washington, sending them to the Eastern Conference Finals, where they eliminated the Carolina Hurricanes in a four-game sweep. After defeating the Hurricanes, the Penguins earned their second consecutive trip to the Stanley Cup Finals against the Detroit Red Wings, to whom they lost the previous year. After losing Games 1 and 2 in Detroit, like the previous years, the Penguins won Games 3 and 4 in Pittsburgh. Each team won on home ice in Games 5 and 6. In Game 7 in Detroit, Maxime Talbot scored two goals, including the game-winner, as the Penguins won 2–1 to win their third Stanley Cup title. Malkin was awarded the Conn Smythe Trophy as the MVP of the playoffs.

New arena and injuries (2009–2015)

During the 2009–10 season, Crosby scored 109 points (51 goals and 58 assists) in 81 games, winning the Maurice "Rocket" Richard Trophy as the NHL season's leading goalscorer. The Penguins, seeded fourth in the East, began their title defense, defeating the Ottawa Senators in six games. In the next round, the Penguins faced the Montreal Canadiens. The teams swapped wins in the series en route to the decisive Game 7, which the Penguins lost 5–2, ending their season and their tenure at Mellon Arena.

In 2010–11, the Penguins played their first game in the Consol Energy Center. On February 11, 2011, the Pittsburgh Penguins–New York Islanders brawl took place. A season-ending concussion suffered by Crosby and a knee injury to Malkin marred the season. The team left early in the playoffs, blowing a 3–1 series lead to Tampa Bay Lightning, with Fleury's goaltending called into question. With Crosby still sidelined with post-concussion syndrome, at the start of the 2011–12 season, Malkin led the Penguins' top line and dominated league scoring. He finished with 50 goals and 109 points as the Penguins earned 51 wins on the season. With Malkin's Art Ross-winning performance, and Crosby's late-season return from injury, the Penguins headed into the 2012 playoffs with high hopes of making a significant Stanley Cup run. However, their cross-state rivals, the Philadelphia Flyers, defeated the highly favored Penguins in six games. Malkin was later awarded the Hart Memorial Trophy and Lester B. Pearson award. Following the Penguins' disappointing playoff exit, general manager Ray Shero made changes to the team at the 2012 NHL Entry Draft for the upcoming 2012–13 season.

During the lockout-shortened 2012–13 season, the Penguins again fought through serious injury. At the end of the regular season, they finished atop the Eastern Conference, matching up against the New York Islanders in round one. The Penguins defeated the Islanders in six games, with Fleury struggling once again. The team then dispatched the Ottawa Senators in five games before being swept in the Conference Finals by the Boston Bruins, scoring just two goals in the entire four-game sweep. On June 13, 2013, Malkin signed an eight-year contract extension worth an annual average of $9.5 million.

In the 2013–14 season, the Penguins suffered numerous injuries throughout the campaign. Despite the adversity, the Penguins won the realigned, eight-team Metropolitan Division, though the club struggled in the playoffs, requiring six games to defeat the Columbus Blue Jackets, then losing to the New York Rangers in seven games despite leading the series 3–1 after four games. This collapse prompted Penguins ownership to fire general manager Shero, replacing him on June 6 with Jim Rutherford, the former general manager of the Carolina Hurricanes. Rutherford's first action as general manager was to fire head coach Dan Bylsma, and on June 25, he announced that Mike Johnston was hired as Bylsma's replacement. In the 2014–15 season, the Penguins led the Metropolitan Division for the first half of the season. However, after losing players to injuries and illnesses, including the mumps, the team fell to fourth in the Division. The Pens lost in five games to the New York Rangers in the first round of the playoffs. In the off-season, Rutherford traded several players and picks to acquire star winger Phil Kessel.

Back-to-back Stanley Cups and 50th anniversary (2015–2017)
After acquiring Kessel, the Penguins had high expectations for the 2015–16 season. However, by December 12, 2015, the team was barely managing a winning season, posting a 15–10–3 record. The organization fired head coach Mike Johnston, and replaced him with Mike Sullivan, who had previously served as the head coach in Wilkes-Barre/Scranton. This move was followed by a series of trades by Jim Rutherford.

The Penguins qualified for the playoffs for the tenth consecutive season. They earned second place in the Metropolitan Division with 104 points. In the playoffs, the Penguins defeated the Rangers in a 4–1 series, the Capitals 4–2 and the Lightning 4–3 to win the Eastern Conference Championship, advancing to the Stanley Cup Finals against the San Jose Sharks. On June 12, 2016, the Penguins defeated the Sharks in a 4–2 series to win their fourth Stanley Cup title. Captain Sidney Crosby was awarded the Conn Smythe Trophy.

The Penguins opened their 50th anniversary season in the NHL as defending Stanley Cup champions, raising their commemorative banner on October 13, 2016, in a shootout victory over Washington. The Penguins faced the Columbus Blue Jackets in the opening round of the 2017 playoffs, defeating them in five games. In the second round, they played against their divisional rival, Washington, and faced them for the second-straight year in the same round, winning a seven-game series. In the Conference Finals, the Penguins eliminated the Ottawa Senators in seven games to advance to the Stanley Cup Finals, where they faced the Nashville Predators. The Penguins won the first two games of the finals and then lost the next two matchups before dominating the fifth and the sixth games of the series to win the Stanley Cup for the second straight year. By defending their title, the Penguins became the first team since the 1997–98 Detroit Red Wings to defend their title successfully and the first to do so in the salary cap era.

Contenders (2017–present)
Before the 2017–18 season, the Penguins lost longtime goaltender Marc-Andre Fleury in the 2017 NHL Expansion Draft to the Vegas Golden Knights. Nevertheless, the Penguins again qualified for the Stanley Cup playoffs with the second division playoff spot, finishing the regular season with 100 points. They defeated the Philadelphia Flyers in the first round in six games, but were defeated by the eventual Stanley Cup champion Washington Capitals in six games. In the next season, the Penguins clinched a playoff berth, but were swept by the New York Islanders in the First Round. In the following season, which was shortened by the COVID-19 pandemic, the team advanced to the 2020 playoffs, but were defeated by the Montreal Canadiens in the Qualifying Round. On February 9, 2021, the Penguins named Ron Hextall as their new general manager, after Jim Rutherford resigned from his post on January 27, because of personal reasons. Brian Burke was hired as president of hockey operations. On February 21, Crosby became the first player to reach 1,000 NHL games for the team. The Penguins won the East Division title, extending their playoff streak to 15 seasons. This became the longest active streak in North American sports as a result of the San Antonio Spurs missing the 2020 NBA playoffs. The 2020–21 season came to an end in Game 6 of the first round of the playoffs against the New York Islanders.

On November 29, 2021, Fenway Sports Group announced its intent to purchase a controlling stake in the Penguins. On December 31, 2021, they officially took over as majority owners of the Penguins.

Team culture

Fanbase

Despite Pittsburgh's long history with hockey and a small but loyal fanbase, the Penguins struggled with fan support early on in its history, at times averaging only 6,000 fans per game when Civic Arena had a seating capacity of over 16,000. Fan support was so low by the team's first bankruptcy that the NHL had no problem with the team being moved, something that would change decades later when the team faced another relocation threat.

While the drafting of Mario Lemieux piqued interest in hockey locally, fans remained skeptical. John Steigerwald, brother of former Penguins broadcaster Paul Steigerwald, noted in his autobiography that upon his arrival at KDKA-TV from WTAE-TV in 1985, the station cared more about the Pittsburgh Spirit of the Major Indoor Soccer League than the Penguins. However, Lemieux's play steadily grew the fanbase in the area, which would only be reassured upon the arrival of Sidney Crosby after the team struggled both on the ice and in attendance following the Jaromir Jagr trade.

Today, the Penguins are one of the NHL's most popular teams, especially among American non-Original Six franchises, and are considered second behind the Steelers among Pittsburgh's three major professional sports teams, taking advantage of both its success and the Pittsburgh Pirates struggles both on and off the field. Especially notable was a 2007 survey done of the four major sports leagues' 122 teams. The Penguins surprised observers by being ranked 20th overall and third among NHL teams, while the Steelers were ranked number one and the Pirates (before the arrival of Andrew McCutchen and that team's turnaround) ranked much lower on the list than its peers. The Penguins' popularity has at times rivaled that of the Steelers at the local level.

Rivalries

Philadelphia Flyers

Considered by some to be the best rivalry in the NHL, the Philadelphia Flyers–Pittsburgh Penguins rivalry began in 1967 when the teams were introduced in the NHL's "Next Six" expansion wave. The rivalry exists both due to divisional alignment and geographic location, as both teams play in Pennsylvania. The Flyers lead the head-to-head record with a 153–98-30 record. However, the Penguins eliminated the Flyers from the playoffs in 2008 and 2009 and were eliminated by them from the playoffs in 2012, strengthening the rivalry. Three years later, the Flyers won the sixth playoff meeting between the clubs to advance to the Conference Semi-finals.
The franchises have met seven times in the playoffs, with the Flyers winning four series (1989 Patrick Division Finals, 4–3; 1997 Eastern Conference Quarter-finals, 4–1; 2000 Eastern Conference Semi-finals, 4–2; and 2012 Eastern Conference Quarter-finals, 4–2) and the Penguins winning three (2008 Eastern Conference Finals, 4–1; 2009 Eastern Conference Quarterfinals, 4–2; and 2018 Eastern Conference First Round, 4–2).

Washington Capitals

The two teams have faced off 11 times in the playoffs, with the Penguins winning nine of the 11 matchups, their two series losses coming in the 1994 and 2018 playoffs. The Penguins defeated the Capitals en route to their five Stanley Cup victories. They have met in a decisive game 7 in the 1992, 1995, 2009 and 2017 playoffs. The NHL's fourth Winter Classic, played on January 1, 2011, at Heinz Field in Pittsburgh showcased this rivalry. The Capitals won the game 3–1. The rivalry can also be seen in the American Hockey League (AHL). Pittsburgh's top farm team is the Wilkes-Barre/Scranton Penguins, and their in-state and biggest rivals are the Capitals' top farm team, the Hershey Bears.

Team information

Crest and sweater design
When the Penguins made their NHL debut in 1967, the team wore the colors dark blue, light blue and white. The uniforms had the word "Pittsburgh" written diagonally down the front of the sweater with three dark blue stripes around the sleeves and bottom. The logo featured a hockey-playing penguin in a scarf over an inverted triangle, symbolizing the Golden Triangle of downtown Pittsburgh. A refined version of the logo appeared on a redesigned uniform in the second season, which removed the scarf and gave the penguin a sleeker look. The circle encompassing the logo was later removed.
The team's colors were originally powder blue, navy blue, and white. The powder blue was changed to royal blue in 1973 but returned in 1977. The team adopted the current black and gold color scheme in 1980 to unify the colors of the city's professional sports teams although, like the Pittsburgh Pirates and the Steelers, the shade of gold more closely resembled yellow. The change was not without controversy, as the Boston Bruins protested by claiming to own the rights to the black and gold colors. However, the Penguins cited the colors worn by the now-defunct NHL team the Pittsburgh Pirates in the 1920s, as well as black and gold being the official colors of the City of Pittsburgh and its namesake, and obtained permission to use the black and gold colors. The NHL's Pittsburgh Pirates used old Pittsburgh Police uniforms, beginning the black and gold color tradition in the city.

The Penguins generally wore the black and gold "skating penguin" uniform between 1980 and 1992, with a few noticeable changes in the lettering and striping. A gold alternate uniform was worn between 1980 and 1984, and briefly replaced the white uniform for home games in the 1983–84 season. 

In the 1992–93 season, the Penguins unveiled new uniforms and introduced the "flying penguin" logo, or "Robopenguin". The team's away uniforms were a throwback to the team's first season, as they revived the diagonal "Pittsburgh" script. In 1995, the team introduced their second alternate jersey, featuring different stripe designs on each sleeve. This jersey proved to be so popular that the team adopted it as their away jersey in 1997. In 2000, the Penguins brought back the "skating penguin" logo, but with a "Vegas gold" shade, upon releasing its new alternate uniform. After 2002, the "skating penguin" was readopted as the primary, though the "flying penguin" remained the alternate. A corresponding white version of the "Vegas gold" uniforms was introduced, and the 1995–2002 black uniform was retired. When the new jerseys were unveiled for the 2007–08 season league wide, the Penguins made major striping pattern changes and removed the "flying penguin" logo from the shoulders.

The Penguins have worn their black jersey at home since the league began the initiative to do so beginning with the 2003–04 NHL season. The team wore their powder blue, 1968–1972 "throwbacks" against the Buffalo Sabres in the 2008 NHL Winter Classic. This throwback was supposedly retired with the introduction of a new dark blue third jersey that made its debut at the 2011 NHL Winter Classic. For the 2011–12 season, the 2011 Winter Classic jersey was the team's official third uniform, with the 2008 Winter Classic uniform having been retired. Called the "Blue Jerseys of Doom" by the Pittsburgh Tribune-Review, the alternate jerseys were worn when Sidney Crosby sustained a broken jaw and when he suffered a concussion in the 2011 Winter Classic. Evgeni Malkin was also concussed during a game when the Penguins donned the alternate uniforms.

In 2014, the Penguins released their new alternate uniforms. The new black uniforms are throwbacks to the early part of Lemieux's playing career, emulating the uniforms worn by the Penguins' 1991 and 1992 Cup-winning teams. The new alternate uniform featured "Pittsburgh gold", the particular shade of gold which had been retired when the Penguins switched to the metallic gold full-time in 2002. The Penguins eventually brought back a white version of the black "Pittsburgh gold" alternates, thus retiring the "Vegas gold" uniforms they wore from 2000 to 2016. A commemorative patch was added to the uniforms throughout the 2016–17 season to celebrate the team's 50th anniversary. During the 2017 NHL Stadium Series against the archrival Philadelphia Flyers, the Penguins wore a special gold uniform featuring military-inspired lettering, a "City of Champions" patch and a variation of the "skating penguin" logo. This design served as the basis for the team's third uniform, which was unveiled in the 2018–19 season and was also partly inspired by the early 1980s gold uniforms. The Penguins wore monochrome black uniforms minus the white elements when they faced the Flyers again in the 2019 NHL Stadium Series.

In 2021, the Penguins wore white "Reverse Retro" uniforms based on the 1992–97 uniforms. This set replaced the "flying penguin" with the alternate "skating penguin" logo minus the gold triangle on the shoulders. A black version served as the replacement for the gold alternate uniforms starting in the 2021–22 season. In the 2022–23 season, the Penguins unveiled their second "Reverse Retro" uniform, this time featuring a black version of the white "flying penguin" uniform they wore from 1992 to 2002.

For the 2023 NHL Winter Classic, the Penguins went with a vintage white uniform with black stripes, and added a gold "P" logo as a nod to the NHL Pirates of the late 1920s.

Media

Radio

The Penguins currently have their radio home on WXDX-FM and their television home on AT&T SportsNet Pittsburgh. The Pittsburgh Penguins Radio Network consists of a total of 34 stations in four states. Twenty three of these are in Pennsylvania, four in West Virginia, three in Ohio, and three in Maryland. The network also features an FM high-definition station in Pittsburgh.

Broadcasters

Local ABC affiliate WTAE-TV broadcast the Penguins during the 1967–68 season, with station Sports Director Ed Conway handling the play-by-play during both the television and radio broadcasts. He remained the lone play-by-play broadcaster until the completion of the 1968–69 season. Joe Tucker took over for Ed Conway during the 1969–70 season, when WPGH-TV and WTAE-TV split Penguins' broadcasts. WPGH-TV retained the rights to broadcast the Penguins for the 1970–71 season, with Bill Hamilton handing the play-by-play duties. The 1970–71 season was also the first season where the Penguins introduced a color commentator to the broadcast team, with John MacDonald taking the position in the booth.

Mike Lange, who joined the Penguins' broadcast team as a play-by-play announcer on the radio side in 1974–75 became the play-by-play broadcaster for the team at the start of the 1979–80 season. At his side was Terry Schiffauer, who had previously held the position of Penguins' director of public relations and eventually transitioned into color commentator for Sam Nover in 1972–73. Lange and Schiffauer remained a team in the Penguins' broadcast booth until 1984–85, when Schiffauer was replaced by Paul Steigerwald. Lange and Steigerwald remained a constant in the broadcast booth from 1985 until 1999. 
With Steigerwald's departure in 1999, Mike Lange shared the broadcast booth with former Penguins' defenseman Peter Taglianetti. Taglianetti remained in the position for one season before being replaced by Eddie Olczyk. Lange and Olczyk were broadcast partners from 2000 until 2003, when Olczyk left the booth to become the 18th head coach in Penguins' history following the firing of previous head coach Rick Kehoe after the 2002–03 season. With Olczyk's vacancy, the Penguins hired Bob Errey as their new color commentator for the start of the 2003–04 season. Lange and Errey remained in the booth until 2005–06. After 26 seasons in the television broadcast booth, FSN Pittsburgh did not retain Mike Lange. Instead, he was replaced by former broadcast partner Paul Steigerwald, who remained the team's TV play-by-play broadcaster until the 2016–17 season. Lange returned to the radio broadcast booth and currently holds the position of radio play-by-play announcer, the same position he held with the team in the mid-1970s. Following the 2016–17 season, Steigerwald moved back to the Penguins front office and NHL Network personality Steve Mears was hired as the new television play-by-play announcer starting with the 2017–18 season. Lange retired in the 2021 offseason, with Josh Getzoff being named as his replacement. Currently, Phil Bourque serves as the radio color commentator.

Every Penguins game is currently carried on the AT&T SportsNet Pittsburgh network, which is carried by cable providers in most of two states and parts of four others. In addition, Fox Sports Ohio simulcasts Penguins hockey in the Cleveland metro area, as well as some parts of Eastern Ohio and Northern Kentucky. Dish Network, Verizon FiOS, and Direct TV each carry the Penguins games on their AT&T SportsNet Pittsburgh channel in HD nationally. The Pittsburgh Penguins also receive monthly and sometimes weekly "game of the week" national exposure on American networks ESPN, ESPN+, ABC, and TNT, and Canadian networks Sportsnet and CBC. Previously, the Penguins received national TV exposure on NBC and NBCSN in the U.S., and TSN in Canada.

In-game announcers
Ryan Mill has been the Penguins’ public address announcer since 2009 when he succeeded John Barbero.  Jeff Jimerson has been the team’s official anthem singer since 1991 and also served in the same capacity in the Jean-Claude Van Damme movie Sudden Death.

Arenas
The Penguins called Civic Arena home for over 45 seasons from their inception in 1967. In September 2010, they completed the move to the state-of-the-art Consol Energy Center (now named the PPG Paints Arena). The Penguins also played two "home" games in the Cleveland suburb of Richfield, Ohio, in 1992 and 1993 at the Richfield Coliseum (this is not unlike the Cleveland Cavaliers of the NBA playing an annual pre-season game in Pittsburgh; the Philadelphia 76ers used the Civic Arena as a second home in the early 1970s).

From 1995 to 2015, the IceoPlex at Southpointe in the South Hills suburbs served as the team's practice facility. Robert Morris University's 84 Lumber Arena has served as a secondary practice facility for the team. During the franchise's first pre-season training camp and pre-season exhibition games, the Brantford Civic Centre in Brantford, Ontario, served as its home, and by the 1970s and continuing through the 1980s, the team was using the suburban Rostraver Ice Garden for training.

In August 2015, the Penguins and the University of Pittsburgh Medical Center (UPMC) opened the UPMC Lemieux Sports Complex, combining a new team practice and training facility with a UPMC Sports Medicine treatment and research complex, in suburban Cranberry Township near the interchange between Interstate 79 and Pennsylvania Route 228. The twin rink facility replaced both the IceoPlex at Southpointe and the 84 Lumber Arena as the Penguins' regular practice facility, freeing up the Consol Energy Center for other events on days the Penguins are not scheduled to play.

As with most other NHL arenas, the Penguins make use of a goal horn whenever the team scores a goal at home. It is also played just before the beginning of a home game, and after a Penguins victory. Their current goal horn made by Nathan Manufacturing, Inc. and introduced in 2005 to coincide with Sidney Crosby joining the team, was used at both the Civic Arena and the Consol Energy Center.

Minor league affiliates
The Penguins have two minor league affiliates assigned to their team. The Wilkes-Barre/Scranton Penguins, their AHL affiliate, have played in Wilkes-Barre Township, Pennsylvania, since 1999. The Penguins also have a secondary affiliate in the ECHL, the Wheeling Nailers, which they have been associated with since the start of the 2000–01 season.

Season-by-season record

This is a partial list of the last five seasons completed by the Penguins.

Note: GP = Games played, W = Wins, L = Losses, T = Ties, OTL = Overtime Losses, Pts = Points, GF = Goals for, GA = Goals against

Players

Current roster

Honored members

Retired numbers

Notes
  Taken out of circulation following Briere's death (1971), but not officially retired until January 5, 2001.
  Lemieux's number was restored when he resumed playing for the team on December 27, 2000, and once again retired on October 5, 2006.
 Though not retired, no. 68 has not been issued since Jaromir Jagr was traded in 2001 and Lemieux himself confirmed that the number would be retired by the franchise in the future.
 The NHL retired Wayne Gretzky's No. 99 for all its member teams at the 2000 NHL All-Star Game.

Hockey Hall of Fame
The Pittsburgh Penguins presently acknowledge an affiliation with a number of inductees to the Hockey Hall of Fame. Inductees affiliated with the Penguins include 14 former players and five builders of the sport. The four individuals recognized as builders by the Hockey Hall of Fame includes former head coaches, and general managers.

In addition to builders and players, broadcasters and sports journalists have also been recognized by the Hockey Hall of Fame. In 2001, radio play-by-play broadcaster Mike Lange, was awarded the Foster Hewitt Memorial Award from the Hall of Fame. In 2009, Dave Molinari, a sports journalist for the Pittsburgh Post-Gazette was awarded the Elmer Ferguson Memorial Award from the Hall of Fame.

Team captains

All the players who have served as team captain with the Penguins franchise

 Ab McDonald, 1967–1968
 Earl Ingarfield, 1968–1969
 Ron Schock, 1973–1977
 Jean Pronovost, 1977–1978
 Orest Kindrachuk, 1978–1981
 Randy Carlyle, 1981–1984
 Mike Bullard, 1984–1986
 Terry Ruskowski, 1986–1987
 Dan Frawley, 1987
 Mario Lemieux, 1987–1994, 1995–1997, 2001–2006
 Ron Francis, 1995, 1997–1998
 Jaromir Jagr, 1998–2001
 Sidney Crosby, 2007–present

Franchise individual records

These are the top-ten point-scorers in franchise history. Figures are updated after each completed NHL regular season.
  – current Penguins player

Franchise goaltending leaders
These are the top-ten goaltenders in franchise history by wins. Figures are updated after each completed NHL regular season.
  – current Penguins player

Franchise playoff scoring leaders
These are the top-ten playoff point-scorers in franchise playoff history. Figures are updated after each completed NHL season.
 – current Penguins player
Note: Pos = Position; GP = Games played; G = Goals; A = Assists; Pts = Points; P/G = Points per gameSource:''

Front office and coaching staff

Executive Committee
 Ownership - Fenway Sports Group
 Minority Owners – Mario Lemieux, Ron Burkle
 Chairman – Mario Lemieux
 President/Chief Executive Officer – Vacant
 President of Business Operations - Kevin Acklin
Hockey Operations
 President of Hockey Operations – Brian Burke
 General Manager – Ron Hextall
 Hockey Operations Director - Alec Schall
 Hockey Operations Manager – Erik Heasley
 Hockey Operations Advisor – Trevor Daley
 Hockey Operations Analyst/Pro Personnel - Andy Saucier
 Head Coach – Mike Sullivan
 Associate Coach – Todd Reirden
 Assistant Coach – Mike Vellucci
 Assistant Coach - Ty Hennes
 Goaltending Coach – Andy Chiodo
 Director of Player Development – Tom Kostopoulos
 Player Development Coach – Chris Butler
 Player Development – Matt Cullen
 Integrated Development Coach – Brett Hextall
 Goaltending Development – Kain Tisi, Chuck Grant
 Sr VP of Integrated Performance - Teena Murray
 Strength & Conditioning – Alex Trinca, Alexi Pianosi
 Video Coach – Madison Nikkel 
 Director of Team Operations – Jason Seidling
Scouting
 Assistant GM, Director of Player Personnel – Chris Pryor
 Director of Amateur Scouting - Nick Pryor
 Director of Professional Scouting – Kerry Huffman

In the community
The Pittsburgh Penguins Foundation conducts numerous community activities to support both youth and families through hockey education and charity assistance.

References

Footnotes

Citations

Further reading

External links

 

 
National Hockey League teams
1967 establishments in Pennsylvania
Companies that filed for Chapter 11 bankruptcy in 1975
Companies that filed for Chapter 11 bankruptcy in 1998
Ice hockey clubs established in 1967
Ice hockey teams in Pittsburgh
Metropolitan Division
Penguins
Professional ice hockey teams in Pennsylvania